Embrace may refer to:

 A hug, a form of physical intimacy
 Acceptance

Art
 Embrace (sculpture), an abstract art work by Sorel Etrog installed near Milwaukee, Wisconsin 
 The Embrace, a statue commemorating Martin Luther King Jr. and Coretta Scott King in Boston, Massachusetts

Books and movies
 Embrace (film), a 2016 Australian documentary about women's body image
 Embrace (novel), a 2001 novel by Mark Behr
 Embrace Again, a 2021 Chinese romance film

Healthcare
 Embrace (non-profit), an organization that distributes a low-cost infant incubator developed at Stanford University
 EMBRACE Healthcare Reform Plan, a proposal for healthcare in the United States first published in 2009
 Embrace Neonatal MRI System, an MRI device that can be used for head and brain scans of newborns

Music

Bands
 Embrace (American band), a post-hardcore band from Washington, D.C.
 Embrace (English band), a post-Britpop band from West Yorkshire
 Embrace (duo), a Danish sister duo who won season 9 of the Danish version of The X Factor
 Embrace Today, an American former straight-edge metalcore–hardcore punk band
 Embraced, a Swedish melodic black metal band

Albums
 Embrace (American band Embrace album), 1987 album by American band Embrace (American band)
 Embrace (Boom Boom Satellites album), by Japanese band Boom Boom Satellites, 2013
 Embrace (Endorphin album), album by Australian band Endorphin, 1998
 Embrace (English band Embrace album), 2014 album by English band Embrace
 Embrace (Armin van Buuren album), a 2015 album by Dutch electronic musician Armin van Buuren
 Embrace (Roswell Rudd, Fay Victor, Lafayette Harris, and Ken Filiano album), 2017 album 
 Embrace, a 2004 album by American jazz saxophonist Dave Pietro
 Embrace, a 2002 Hindi-language album by German musician Deva Premal, vocals by Jai Uttal
 Embrace, a 2002 English-language album by German trance group Fragma
 Embrace, a 2003 album by American jazz saxophonist Najee
 Embrace, a 2008 EP by Australian dance duo Pnau
 Embrace, a 2009 album by American band Sleepy Sun
 EMBRACE, a 2022 album by American electronic musician Kill the Noise

Songs
 "Embrace", by Korn from Untouchables (2002)
 "Embrace" (Pnau song), (2008)
 "E.M.B.R.A.C.E.", by Society of Soul from Brainchild (1995)
"The Embrace", from the film score of the 1993 film The Piano, composed by Michael Nyman
 "Embrace", by the Bee Gees, from the 2001 album  This Is Where I Came In

Technology
 EMBRACE, a European former project involving information technology in biomolecular sciences
 EMBRACE (telescope), a prototype radio telescope located in France and The Netherlands
 Embrace, a brand name of smartwatches produced by Empatica, a company based in Boston, Massachusetts

Other
 Embrace, extend, and extinguish, a business strategy
 Embrace of Acatempan, an 1821 event in Mexican history

See also
 
 
 Embracer Group, a Swedish video game and media holding company
 Embracery, an attempt to influence a juror